Dan Moloney may refer to:
 Dan Moloney (footballer)
 Dan Moloney (wrestler)

See also
 Daniel Moloney, Irish politician